Muttalib or Muttaleb  may refer to:

Abdul Muttalib (disambiguation), people with the name
Ismail Muttalib, Malaysian politician
Muttalib ibn Abd Manaf, one of the ancestors of the Sahaba